Telophorus is a genus of bird in the bushshrike family, Malaconotidae.

Extant Species
It contains the following species:

References
Lack, Peter (2007) ABC African Checklist. Downloaded 18/09/07.

 
Bird genera
Taxonomy articles created by Polbot